Michael Yezerski is an Australian composer known for his scores for feature films such as The Waiting City, The Black Balloon (for which he won an APRA Award and a Screen Music Award), Newcastle, and Thursday's Fictions, as well as collaborations with the Australian Chamber Orchestra and the Gondwana Voices Children's Choir (such as an adaptation of Shaun Tan's book The Red Tree), the National Museum of Canberra, Synergy Percussion and The Physical TV Company.

In an interview with Headliner Magazine, Yezerski discussed composing the score for 2019 horror film, The Vigil: "Why have there been so many horror films that have explored the various denominations of Christianity and demons and devils and everything associated with Christianity, but there has hardly ever been a film that explores the dark side of Jewish mysticism? I'm Jewish myself, so this is exactly the question that I've been asking. What I love about horror films, and dark, edgy films, in general – there's so much creative license to play with musical effects in non traditional ways. It's really fun as a composer."

Filmography as composer

Film

Television

Awards and nominations

APRA Awards
The annual APRA Awards include the Screen Music Awards which are presented by Australasian Performing Right Association (APRA) and Australian Guild of Screen Composers (AGSC). The APRA Awards also include the Classical Music Awards which are distributed by APRA and the Australian Music Centre (AMC).
2008 Screen Music Awards, Best Original Song Composed for the Screen win for "When We Get There" on The Black Balloon composed by Josh Pyke and Michael Yezerski.
2008 Screen Music Awards, Best Original Song Composed for the Screen nomination for "The Greatest Act in History" on The Black Balloon, composed by Yezerski.
2008 Screen Music Awards, Best Soundtrack Album win for The Black Balloon composed by Yezerski.
2009 Classical Music Awards, Best Composition by an Australian Composer nomination for The Red Tree composed by Yezerski and Richard Tognetti.

References

External links

APRA Award winners
Australian film score composers
Male film score composers
Living people
Year of birth missing (living people)